The 1966 Kent State Golden Flashes football team was an American football team that represented Kent State University in the Mid-American Conference (MAC) during the 1966 NCAA University Division football season. In their third season under head coach Leo Strang, the Golden Flashes compiled a 4–6 record (2–4 against MAC opponents), finished in fifth place in the MAC, and outscored all opponents by a combined total of 211 to 161.

The team's statistical leaders included Don Fitzgerald with 1,245 rushing yards, Ron Swartz with 879 passing yards, and Billy Blunt with 287 receiving yards. Five Kent State players were selected as first-team All-MAC players: defensive end Don Abbott, offensive guard Jon Brooks, halfback Don Fitzgerald, defensive back Lou Harris, and linebacker Bill Landis.

Schedule

References

Kent State
Kent State Golden Flashes football seasons
Kent State Golden Flashes football